The Lenin Enrolment or the Lenin's call to the party (Lenin Levy) (after Vladimir Lenin) was an effort from 1923 to 1925 to enroll more members of the proletariat into the Communist party and incite them to become active in party affairs. In total, over 500,000 were recruited.

It came in response to growing criticism of the Communist party as elitist by the rank and file. Even though the party claimed to represent the working class, most of its membership, and particularly its leadership, including Lenin himself, came from the educated classes. The criticism reached a peak at the 10th party congress in 1920 when the "workers' opposition" openly challenged Lenin. Even though Lenin managed to put down the rebellion within party ranks that time, the pressure to make the party more representative of its supposed base could no longer be ignored.

See also
Membership of the Communist Party of the Soviet Union

References 
 EH Carr The interregnum Harmondsworth 1969, p361.
 Hatch, J. (1989). The "Lenin Levy" and the Social Origins of Stalinism: Workers and the Communist Party in Moscow, 1921-1928. Slavic Review, 48(4), 558-577. doi:10.2307/2499783.
 Genesis of bureaucratic socialism 

Politics of the Soviet Union
1923 establishments in the Soviet Union